Jakob Edelstein (AKA Yacov, Yaakov, Jakub Edelstein or Edlstein; 25 July 1903 – 20 June 1944) was a Czechoslovak Zionist, social democrat and the first Jewish Elder in the Theresienstadt ghetto. He was murdered in Auschwitz-Birkenau.

Life and work 
Jakob Edelstein was born into a devout Ashkenazi family in Horodenka at that time in the Austro-Hungarian Empire, nowadays in the Ivano-Frankivsk Oblast, Ukraine. His parents were Motl and Mattil Edelstein, he had a sister called Dora.

During World War I, the family fled Horodenka in 1915 to Brno in Moravia to avoid the Russian army, that organised a pogrom against the Jewish people of the town, nine Jews were hanged in the main street of Horodenka. When his family returned after the war to Horodenka, Jakob stayed in Brno to finish his studies at a business school. After his graduation he left Brno for Teplitz in northern Bohemia to work as a traveling salesman.

Edelstein became a fierce member of the Poale Zion movement and an activist in the Social Democrat Party. In 1927 he left the Party and was for two years only active in the Přátelé přírody, a (social democrat movement of nature friends).

From 1926 Edelstein was involved in the Hechalutz (the pioneer), a Zionist youth organisation and in World War II a resistance movement, later he worked at their head office.
Edelstein joined in 1929 the Histadrut, an organisation of trade unions for and later in Israel.

Jakob Edelstein married in 1931 and left Teplitz with his bride Miriam for Prague to work for the Palästina-Amt (Palestine Office of the Zionist movement). Beginning 1933 he acted as head of that office, he remained in this position until the office was closed right before the outbreak of the War.

In 1937 he was for several months very active for the Keren Hayesod (a fund raising organisation) in Jerusalem.

Before the war Edelstein and his family had the opportunity and the documents for immigration to Eretz Israel, they planned to get to Kibbutz Givat Haim, but Edelstein chose to stay in Czechoslovakia and with his community.

World War II 

On 15 March 1939, Germany annexed what was left of Czechoslovakia and established the protectorate of Bohemia and Moravia. Edelstein called for the Zionist leaders to head the Jewish community, and became the liaison between the Jewish community and the SS to deal with Jewish emigration. For this purpose Edelstein travelled, with permission of the Gestapo, between 1939 and 1941 abroad to Bratislava, Vienna, Berlin, Trieste and Genoa.

Edelstein and his substitute Otto Zucker visited England and the British Mandate for Palestine in 1938 to help facilitate the evacuation of Jewish refugees, his wife was ordered to stay in Czechoslovakia, thus forcing him to return home. In 1940 Edelstein went to Trieste in order to evacuate Czechoslovak Jews. In March 1941 he and his associate Richard Friedmann were commanded by the SS to instruct the chairmen of the Jewish Council in Amsterdam, Abraham Asscher and David Cohen to establish an administrative apparatus between the counsel and the "Central Office for Jewish Emigration in Amsterdam" (the only one in Western Europe), like the Central Office in Prague.

On 18 October 1939 Edelstein, Friedmann and another thousand Jewish men were, due to the so-called Nisko-und-Lublin-Plan, deported from Ostrava to Nisko in the Lublin reservation, a concentration camp in the General Government. After the Nisko Plan was dissolved, for pragmatic reasons, Edelstein returned to Prague in November 1939.

On 4 December 1941, by order of the head of the "Central Office for Jewish Emigration in Prague" SS-Sturmbannführer (major) Hans Günther, Edelstein and his family were deported to Theresienstadt. They were among transport Stab, č.

The camp commandant SS-Obersturmführer Siegfried Seidl designated him as the first Judenältester (Jewish Elder) of the Jewish Council of Elders in the ghetto.

Edelstein and his associates were determined to prevent further deportations to the East by organizing a self-sustaining, productive community that the Germans would find indispensable to their war effort."" (Jewish work to save Jewish lives), was the idea behind Edelsteins policy.

In January 1943 Edelstein was replaced as Judenältester by Paul Eppstein and became his first substitute.

At a count in the ghetto on 9 November 1943 a difference of 55 Jews between the registered and the actual number of inmates appeared. Edelstein was accused of aiding the escape of inmates and was arrested on November 11, 1943.

On 15 December 1943, Edelstein was deported to the Auschwitz I concentration camp, where he was kept isolated in Block 11 for half a year. He was deported on Transport Dr. His wife, his son, and his mother in law were sent to the Theresienstadt family camp at Auschwitz II-Birkenau, Biib. The family was reunited on 20 June 1944. Jakob Edelstein had to watch the murder of first his mother in law then his wife Miriam and his twelve-year-old son Ariel before he was shot to death in the crematorium of the gas chamber.

In June 1947, on the three-year yahrzeit of Yacov Edelstein's death in Auschwitz, Max Brod wrote: "And so a Jewish hero left this world, a man who up to the end did everything he possibly could and never gave up.

Literature 

 Israel Gutman: Enzyklopädie des Holocaust - Die Verfolgung und Ermordung der europäischen Juden, Piper Verlag, München/Zürich 1998, 3 Bände, 
 Hans Günther Adler: Theresienstadt: das Antlitz einer Zwangsgemeinschaft 1941-1945 Nachwort Jeremy Adler. Wallstein, Göttingen, 986 pages, 2005 
 Bondy, Ruth. Elder of the Jews": Jakob Edelstein of Theresienstadt, translated from the Hebrew 1989,

References

External links 
 Photograph of Jakob Edelstein United States Holocaust Memorial Museum Photo Archives
 Edelstein, Dr. Jakub Das Theresienstadt-Lexikon
 Documents about Jakob Edelstein in the collection of the Jewish Museum Prague.

1903 births
1944 deaths
Czech people who died in Auschwitz concentration camp
Czechoslovak Jews
Czechoslovak civilians killed in World War II
Theresienstadt Ghetto prisoners
People from Horodenka
Politicians who died in Nazi concentration camps
Czech Jews who died in the Holocaust
Jewish Czech politicians
Austro-Hungarian Jews
Ukrainian Jews
People from the Kingdom of Galicia and Lodomeria
Jews from Galicia (Eastern Europe)